Podzamcze may refer to the following places:
Podzamcze, Kuyavian-Pomeranian Voivodeship (north-central Poland)
Podzamcze, Lublin County in Lublin Voivodeship (east Poland)
Podzamcze, Łęczna County in Lublin Voivodeship (east Poland)
Podzamcze, Świdnik County in Lublin Voivodeship (east Poland)
Podzamcze, Busko County in Świętokrzyskie Voivodeship (south-central Poland)
Podzamcze, Kielce County in Świętokrzyskie Voivodeship (south-central Poland)
Podzamcze, Masovian Voivodeship (east-central Poland)
Podzamcze, Silesian Voivodeship (south Poland)
Podzamcze, Lubusz Voivodeship (west Poland)
Podzamcze, Pomeranian Voivodeship (north Poland)
Podzamcze (Wałbrzych), city district of Wałbrzych in Lower Silesia

See also